Sai-saki-mode is a term used to describe the Hatsumōde of 2021 (the third year of Reiwa) in the midst of the third wave of the new coronavirus infection epidemic.  It was first proposed by a shrine in Fukuoka Prefecture and recommended by the Fukuoka Prefecture Shrine Agency.

Originally, there was a Japanese culture of greeting each other at the end of the year and wishing each other a happy new year, and it quickly spread across the country because it matched the feeling of wishing for a "good luck" new year by completing preparations for the New Year by the end of December. There are also shrines and temples that call it "Koshomairi".

Shrines and temples that perform good luck pilgrimages 

 Shrines in Fukuoka Prefecture
 Kanda Shrine (Tokyo Chiyoda, Tokyo)
 Yushima Tenmangū (Tokyo Metropolitan Government Bunkyō)
 Jindai-ji (Tokyo, Chofu City)
 Omi Shrine (Shiga Prefecture Ōtsu)
 Kasuga-taisha (Nara Prefecture Nara City)

Footnotes

See also 

 Hatsumōde

External links 

 

2020 in Japan
COVID-19 pandemic in Japan
Buddhist temples
Buddhist holidays
Shinto shrines
Shinto festivals
Shinto and society
Shinto
New Year in Japan